Volchya Alexandrovka is a rural locality (a selo) and the administrative center of Volchye-Alexandrovskoye Rural Settlement, Volokonovsky District, Belgorod Oblast, Russia. The population was 896 as of 2010. There are 9 streets.

Geography 
Volchya Alexandrovka is located 24 km west of Volokonovka (the district's administrative centre) by road. Volchy-Vtoroy is the nearest rural locality.

References 

Rural localities in Volokonovsky District